The 1981 African Men's Handball Championship was the fourth edition of the African Men's Handball Championship, held in Tunis, Tunisia, from 18 July to 1 August 1981. It acted as the African qualifying tournament for the 1982 World Championship in West Germany.

In the final, Algeria won their first title beating Ivory Coast in the final game.

Qualified teams

Venue
El Menzah Sports Palace, Tunis

Draw

Group stage

Group A

Group B

Knockout stage

Semifinals

Third place game

Final

Final ranking

References

African handball championships
Handball
A
Handball
Handball in Tunisia
20th century in Tunis
Sports competitions in Tunis
July 1981 sports events in Africa
August 1981 sports events in Africa